Elana Meyers Taylor (born Elana Alessandra Meyers; October 10, 1984) is an American Olympic bobsledder and World Champion who has competed since 2007. Born in Oceanside, California, Meyers Taylor was raised in Douglasville, Georgia and is a graduate of The George Washington University, where she was a member of the softball team.

Career
Meyers Taylor won the silver in the bobsled two-woman event with Shauna Rohbock at the 2009 FIBT World Championships in Lake Placid, New York.

She was named to the U.S. team for the 2010 Winter Olympics on January 16, 2010.

On February 24, 2010, Meyers Taylor and Erin Pac won the bronze medal at the 2010 Winter Olympic Games.  Their first run has a time of 53.28.  Their second run has a time of 53.05.  Their third run has a time of 53.29.  Their fourth run has a time of 53.78 for a total of 3:33.40, a difference of +1.12 from first place.

In 2010, Elana Meyers Taylor received a grant from the Women's Sports Foundation (WSF) Travel and Training Fund, and another in 2013. She went on to serve on the WSF advisory board and eventually served as their president in 2019.

Meyers Taylor and brake-woman Katie Eberling placed second at the 2013 FIBT World Championships in St. Moritz.

On February 19, 2014, Meyers Taylor and Lauryn Williams won the silver medal at the 2014 Winter Olympic Games.  Their first run has a time of 57.26, a track record.  Their second run has a time of 57.63.  Their third run has a time of 57.69.  Their fourth run has a time of 58.13 for a total of 3:50.71, a difference of +0.10 from first place, just edged out by rival Canada 1, piloted by Kaillie Humphries and braked by Heather Moyse.

In April 2014, she took part in 2014 China Women's Sevens with United States women's national rugby union team (sevens)

In September 2014, the Fédération Internationale de Bobsleigh et de Tobogganing announced it would allow mixed-gender crews to compete in four-man bobsleigh. On 8 November, Meyers Taylor led a four-man crew to third place in the US trials, securing a place to compete for the US national team, despite only having four days training in a four-man sled.  On November 15, 2014, Meyers and Kaillie Humphries of Canada became the first women to compete with/against men in an international four-man bobsleigh competition, in the season-opening North American Cup race in Park City, Utah. Meyers Taylor piloted her mixed-team's sled to a seventh-place finish, Humphries piloted hers to sixth.

In February 2015, Meyers Taylor and pusher Cherrelle Garrett beat three German crews to win the first world championship title in women's bobsled for the United States. This also made Meyers Taylor the first U.S. bobsled driver, either male or female, in 56 years to win a worlds title on a non-North American track.

In February 2018, Meyers Taylor and pusher Lauren Gibbs won a silver medal in the two-woman bobsleigh event at the 2018 Winter Olympics.

Meyers Taylor was chosen as a flag bearer for the 2022 US Olympic team but was unable to attend the opening ceremony due to testing positive for COVID-19 and was replaced by Brittany Bowe who served on her behalf.

Personal life
Elana Meyers Taylor was born in Oceanside, California but grew up in Douglasville, Georgia with her family. Her father was a professional football player.  After failing to make the US Olympic softball team, she tried bobsledding at her parents' suggestion.

Meyers Taylor attended The George Washington University on a scholarship for softball. The university later presented Taylor with an honorary doctorate in 2018 and the President's Medal in 2022. Meyers Taylor was the commencement speaker for the university's Class of 2022.

Meyers Taylor married coach and fellow Olympic bobsledder Nic Taylor in April 2014. She gave birth to her son, Nico, in 2020, at the beginning of the COVID-19 pandemic. Nico was born with Down syndrome.

Meyers Taylor is a Christian. She has said, "One of the big reasons I was put in bobsled is to help people not only reach their goals but come to Christ. God put me here for a specific reason, and I don't think it's just to win medals. At the end of the day, I'm in this sport to glorify God, so if that means I come in last place, or I win the gold medal, that's what I'm going to do."

Activism and overcoming adversity 
In January 2014, Elana Meyers Taylor suffered a concussion while racing in Konigssee, Germany. Just four days after the initial incident, Taylor was cleared to compete again and, within a month, had won a world championship title. However, Meyers Taylor's symptoms returned during a 2-month-long internship with the International Olympic Committee in Switzerland. In November 2014, she took another hit to her head and was not fully cleared to compete and practice again until mid-December of that year. In 2018,  Meyers Taylor announced she would be donating her brain to concussion research as a way to help and empower future female athletes. Meyers has also suffered and come back from a torn achilles.

In November 2014, Meyers Taylor made history by becoming the first woman to win a medal in a men's event as part of an international competition. Not only was she one of the first women to compete in a mixed-gender four-man race, she did so with her husband Nic Taylor as her brakeman.

In a 2018 US Olympic Committee press release, Elana Meyers Taylor spoke out about her drive to advocate for female athletes and females, writing that as a woman of Team USA, she "has a responsibility to fight for equality for those who can't. She loves the responsibility." In January 2019, Elana Meyers Taylor began her term as president of the Women's Sports Foundation due to her passion and advocacy work for female athlete.

On June 26, 2020, Elana Meyers Taylor called attention to the racism she has faced throughout her athletic career—specifically in her bobsledding career—in an article by Team USA. She details an incident in which an Olympic coach of another country's team made multiple racist statements, both general and specific to Elana Meyers Taylor. Taylor's article also explained that one of the fastest sled manufacturers in the world refuses to sell to black bobsledders. Elana's article resulted in the creation of a task force by the International Bobsled and Skeleton Federation to investigate these incidents. Additionally, Meyers Taylor announced she was creating a workshop for others to share and spread their experiences facing racism to expose the biases that often lead to racist incidents and to teach alternative behaviors that do not cause discrimination.

References

"Upperton Wins Second Race of the Season". International Bobsleigh & Skeleton Federation. December 12, 2008.

External links
 
 
 
 
 

1984 births
Living people
American female bobsledders
American female rugby union players
Bobsledders at the 2010 Winter Olympics
Bobsledders at the 2014 Winter Olympics
Bobsledders at the 2018 Winter Olympics
Bobsledders at the 2022 Winter Olympics
People from Douglasville, Georgia
Sportspeople from Fulton County, Georgia
Olympic silver medalists for the United States in bobsleigh
Olympic bronze medalists for the United States in bobsleigh
Medalists at the 2010 Winter Olympics
Medalists at the 2014 Winter Olympics
Medalists at the 2018 Winter Olympics
Medalists at the 2022 Winter Olympics
Female rugby union players
United States women's international rugby union players
George Washington University alumni
Sportspeople from the Atlanta metropolitan area